Isophorone is an α,β-unsaturated cyclic ketone.  It is a colorless liquid with a characteristic peppermint-like odor, although commercial samples can appear yellowish. Used as a solvent and as a precursor to polymers, it is produced on a large scale industrially.

Structure and reactivity 
Isophorone undergoes reactions characteristic of an α,β-unsaturated ketone.  Hydrogenation gives the cyclohexanone derivative.  Epoxidation with basic hydrogen peroxide affords the oxide. 

Isophorone is degraded by attack of hydroxyl radicals.

Photodimerization
When exposed to sunlight in aqueous solutions, isophorone undergoes 2+2 photocycloaddition to give three isomeric photodimers (Figure). These "diketomers" are cis-syn-cis, head to tail (HT), cys-anti-cys (HT), and head-head (HH). The formation of HH photodimers is favored over HT photodimers with increasing polarity of the medium.

Natural Occurrence 

Isophorone occurs naturally in cranberries.

Synthesis 
Isophorone is produced on a multi-thousand ton scale by the aldol condensation of acetone using KOH. Diacetone alcohol, mesityl oxide, and 3-hydroxy-3,5,5-trimethylcyclohexan-1-one are intermediates.  A side product is beta-isophorone, where the C=C group is not conjugated with the ketone.

Applications
The partly hydrogenated derivative trimethylcyclohexanone is used in production of polycarbonates.  It condenses with phenol to give an analogue of bisphenol A. Polycarbonates produced by phosgenation of these two diols produces a polymer with improved thermal stability. Trimethyladipic acid and 2,2,4-trimethylhexamethylenediamine are produced from trimethylcyclohexanone and trimethylcyclohexanol. They are used to make specialty polyamides. Hydrocyanation gives the nitrile followed by reductive amination gives isophorone diamine.  This diamine is used to produce isophorone diisocyanate which has certain niche applications.

 
Full hydrogenation gives 3,3,5-Trimethylcyclohexanol, a precursor to both sunscreens and chemical weapons.

Safety
The LD50 value of isophorone in rats and rabbits by oral exposure is around the 2.00 g/kg. The safety aspects of isophorone have been subject to several studies.

History
The use of isophorone as a solvent resulted from the search for ways to dispose of or recycle acetone, which is a waste product of phenol synthesis by the Hock method.

See also
Phorone
beta-Isophorone

References

Enones
Ketone solvents
Cyclohexenes